Diary of a Future President is an American comedy-drama television series created by Ilana Peña which premiered on Disney+ on January 17, 2020. Gina Rodriguez serves as an executive producer through her company I Can & I Will Productions, which produces the series in association with CBS Studios. 

Told through a collection of voice-overs by central character Elena as she reads from her diary, the series centers on the 13-year-old Cuban American girl, who attends middle school as she aspires to be a future president of the United States. The series stars Tess Romero, Charlie Bushnell, Selenis Leyva and Michael Weaver. Rodriguez also appears through flashforwards as the adult version of Elena, as she serves as President of the United States.

In May 2020, the series was renewed for a second season, which premiered on August 18, 2021, with all ten episodes. In December 2021, the series was canceled after two seasons.

Premise
Elena is a 13-year-old Cuban American girl who attends middle school and must make her way through the personal and social pressures of adolescence. As the series is told through Elena's narration as written in her diary, it follows the daily events of her life and her interactions with friends and family. She lives with her older brother, Bobby; and mother, Gabi, who develops a new relationship with Sam, a lawyer from her firm. Elena has a strong desire to become a president of the United States, which is made visible through flashforwards to her tenure as President.

Cast and characters

Main

 Tess Romero as Elena Cañero-Reed, a confident and strong-willed 13-year-old Cuban American girl with a desire to become a future president of the United States. In season one, Elena is a 6th grader; going into the second season, she is in 7th grade.
Gina Rodriguez as Future Elena Cañero-Reed, who is shown through flashforwards to be the future President of the United States. She has a more prominent role in the second season as a figment of Elena's imagination.
 Selenis Leyva as Gabriela "Gabi" Cañero-Reed, Elena's widowed mother who works as a lawyer.
 Charlie Bushnell as Roberto "Bobby" Cañero-Reed, Elena's rage inducing older brother who is coming to terms with his sexuality.
 Michael Weaver as Sam Faber, a lawyer at Gabi's firm who she develops a new relationship with.

Recurring
 Carmina Garay as Sasha, Elena's best friend
 Sanai Victoria as Melissa, Elena and Sasha's former rival who "stole" their best friend, Jessica
 Jessica Marie Garcia as Camila, a paralegal and Gabi's close friend, who is scared to come out to her parents that she has a girlfriend.
 Harmeet Pandey as Jessica, Elena's former best friend who is now friends with Melissa. In season 2 she becomes friends with Elena and Sasha again.
 Avantika Vandanapu as Monyca with a 'Y' (season 1), Bobby's ex-girlfriend.
 Brandon Severs as Liam, Bobby's teammate and friend for whom Bobby has feelings
 Nathan Arenas as Danny, a teammate and a friend of Bobby and Liam
 Gregg Binkley as Dr. Cooper, the school’s Vice Principal
 Ellie Reed as Danielle, Camila's fiancé 
 Tony Espinosa as Emilio (season 2), a transfer student who runs for student rep alongside Elena
 Donovin Miller as CJ (season 2), a high school junior with whom Bobby becomes romantically involved

Notable guests
 Rachel Bloom as Ms. Wexler, an English teacher who catches Elena and Sasha shopping in an intimates store.
 Melissa Fumero as Ms. Ortega, a drama teacher who produces a musical about Miami and casts Sasha as the lead
 Michael Hitchcock as Thomas, a man who gets rear ended when Gabi teaches Bobby how to drive.

Episodes

Series overview

Season 1 (2020)

Season 2 (2021)

Production

Development
On January 31, 2019, it was announced that Disney+ had ordered a ten episode first season of a new single-camera comedy, which was originally titled Diary of a Female President. It was reported that the series was created by Ilana Peña, who would also serve as an executive producer alongside Gina Rodriguez and Emily Gipson. Robin Shorr was expected to be involved as the showrunner. The series is produced by Rodriguez's company I Can & I Will in association with CBS Television Studios, who sold the series to Disney. CBS chief creative officer David Nevins stated that the series was considered to air on The CW, but that it was more ultimately more suitable for the target audience of Disney+. The program was the first scripted series produced by an external studio to be ordered by Disney+. In December 2019, it was revealed that the program's titled had changed to Diary of a Future President. On May 29, 2020, Disney+ renewed the series for a second season. On July 12, 2021, it was revealed that the second season would premiere a month later on August 18, along with the release of a short first look of the season. On December 13, 2021, Disney+ canceled the series after two seasons.

Writing
The series represents a Latino family, with Elena being referred to as Cuban American in character descriptions. Rodriguez stated that she established her production company in an effort to express stories "for and by the underrepresented". The series has been stated to be inspired by Peña's own childhood.

Casting
In July 2019, executive producer Rodriguez was announced to be playing the adult version of Elena, who appears in flashforwards as she undertakes her political campaign. Rodriguez was also revealed to be directing the first episode of the series. It was also announced that Tess Romero and Charlie Bushnell would be playing siblings Elena and Bobby respectively, while Selenis Leyva was cast as their mother, Gabi; and Michael Weaver as her love interest, Sam.

Filming
Production on the first season began in July 2019 in Los Angeles. It was originally expected that the season would film from June to September. The second season began filming in October 2020, after multiple delays due to the COVID-19 pandemic.

Release
The first episode was released on the streaming service Disney+, in the United States and internationally on January 17, 2020, in 4K HDR. Episodes were released weekly. All ten episodes of the second season were released on August 18, 2021.

Marketing
The first poster was released on December 16, 2019, alongside details of the first two episodes. The first trailer for the series was released on January 6, 2020, with an additional poster also revealed.

Reception

Audience viewership 
According to Whip Media, Diary of a Future President was the 3rd rising show, based on the week-over-week growth in episodes watched for a specific program, during the week of August 22, 2021.

Critical response
On Rotten Tomatoes, the series holds an approval rating of 100% based on 8 reviews.

Daniel Fienberg of The Hollywood Reporter complimented how the series manages to focus on different aspects of adolescence, while praising the performances of the cast and its diversity. Brian Lowry of CNN compared the series to Jack & Bobby for its premise, stated that Diary of a Future President manages to skillfully approach Tess Romero's character's process of living through adolescence, while finding Romero's performance very well executed. Emily Ashby of Common Sense Media rated the show 3 out of 5 stars, found the depiction of self-assurance and positivity across Romero's character inspirational, and complimented the diversity among the cast members.

Accolades

References

External links
 
 

2020s American comedy-drama television series
2020 American television series debuts
2021 American television series endings
2020s American LGBT-related comedy television series
2020s American LGBT-related drama television series
2020s American school television series
Disney+ original programming
English-language television shows
Gay-related television shows
Television series about teenagers
Television series by CBS Studios
Hispanic and Latino American television
Television shows filmed in Los Angeles
Television shows set in Miami